Universal Madness is the second live album by ska/pop band Madness, released on 2 March 1999 (see 1999 in music) through the Goldenvoice label. It was recorded at the Universal Amphitheater on 26 April 1998 in Los Angeles. The show was Madness' first in America since 1984.

Reception
As the album features most of the band's singles, it "ultimately serves as mere nostalgia," according to AllMusic, "not quite a hollow experience, but not an epiphany either." They felt that while the album "doesn't disappoint too greatly, it rarely captures the giddy glee Madness can pull off," adding that the band "sounds fine in a workmanlike way." Trouser Press wrote, "The musicianship is tight as ever ([Lee] Thompson sounds particularly inspired on sax) and the sound quality is good, but [Graham] McPherson's singing falters more and more as the disc goes on. ... Madstock! is the better choice for anyone searching for a disc of live Madness."

Track listing

Personnel
Madness
 Graham "Suggs" McPherson – lead vocals
 Mike Barson – keyboards
 Chris Foreman – guitar
 Lee Thompson – saxophone, backup vocals
 Daniel Woodgate – drums
 Mark Bedford – bass
 Cathal Smyth – backup vocals, trumpet
Technical
Cedric Singleton – executive producer
Guy Charbonneau – engineer
Charlie Bouis – assistant engineer
Jerry Finn – mixing
Chuck Sperry – artwork
Ron Donovan – layout, design

References

External links

1999 live albums
Madness (band) live albums